Weicheng District is a district of Weifang, Shandong, China.

Administrative divisions
As 2012, this district is divided to 6 subdistricts.

Subdistricts

References

External links 
 Information page

County-level divisions of Shandong
Weifang